Afraltha is a genus of moths in the family Limacodidae and the subfamily Limacodinae. It has 3 species.

List of species 

 Afraltha chionostola Hampson, 1910
 Afraltha sudanicola Clench, 1955
 Afraltha xanthocharis Clench, 1955

References 

Moth genera
 
Limacodinae